Last Chance to Dance may refer to:

 Last Chance to Dance (Hello Sailor album), 1982
 Last Chance to Dance (Ian McLagan album), 1985
 "Last Chance to Dance (Bad Friend)", a song by A Day to Remember from the album You're Welcome